William Radford (1809–1890) was a rear admiral of the United States Navy.

William Radford may also refer to:

William Radford (politician) (1814–1870), United States Representative from New York 
William A. Radford (1865–1943), American architect and publisher
William Howard Radford (born 1930), Welsh former footballer

See also
William Redford (born 1958), British businessman
Radford (surname)